Glencoe School is a historic school building located near Glencoe, Alamance County, North Carolina. It was built in 1936 with Public Works Administration to serve the Glencoe Mill community and nearby families. It is a one-story, frame school with brick veneer influenced by the Colonial Revival and American Craftsman styles.  A cafeteria addition was built in 1951. The school remained in use until 1963, then served as administrative offices for the County Board of Education.

It was added to the National Register of Historic Places in 2010.

References

Public Works Administration in North Carolina
School buildings on the National Register of Historic Places in North Carolina
School buildings completed in 1936
Schools in Alamance County, North Carolina
National Register of Historic Places in Alamance County, North Carolina